Canby may refer to:

People
 Canby (surname)

Places
In the United States
 Canby, California
 Canby, Iowa
 Canby, Minnesota
 Canby, Oregon
 Canby Creek, a stream in Minnesota
 Canby Mountains, Oregon